Aulus Postumius Albinus  may refer to:

Aulus Postumius Albinus (consul 242 BC), Roman senator
Aulus Postumius Albinus (consul 151 BC), Roman senator
Aulus Postumius Albinus (consul 99 BC), Roman senator
Aulus Postumius Albinus Luscus, Roman senator
Aulus Postumius Albinus Regillensis, Roman senator

See also